György Szűcs (23 April 1912, in Szombathely – 10 December 1991, in Budapest) was a Hungarian footballer who played for Újpest FC, as well as representing the Hungarian national football team at the 1934 and the 1938 FIFA World Cup. He went on to coach Salgótarjáni BTC, SZEAC and Tatabányai Bányász.

External links

Sportspeople from Szombathely
Hungarian footballers
Hungarian football managers
Hungarian expatriate football managers
Hungary international footballers
Újpest FC players
1934 FIFA World Cup players
1938 FIFA World Cup players
1912 births
1991 deaths
Debreceni VSC managers
FC Tatabánya managers
Association football midfielders
Hungarian expatriate sportspeople in Iran
Iran national football team managers
Expatriate football managers in Iran